The year 1665 in music involved some significant events.

Events 
May 27 – John Loosemore completes the construction of the organ at Exeter Cathedral.
Francesco Cavalli becomes first organist of St Mark's Basilica in Venice.

Bands formed
Band of the Grenadier Guards, under the terms of a Royal Warrant issued the previous year.

Publications 
Christoph Bernhard – Geistliche Harmonien, Op.1
Wojciech Bobowski – Mezmurlar, a collection of psalms in Turkish
Giovanni Felice Sances – Missa Sanctae Mariae Magdalenae
Christopher Simpson – The Principles of Practical Musick

Classical music 
John Blow – I will always give thanks
Maurizio Cazzati 
Sonate a 2, 3, 4 e 5 con alcune per tromba, Op.35
Messa e salmi a 5 voci con 4 istromenti, Op.36
Jean Baptiste Lully – La naissance de Vénus, LWV 27 (ballet, premiered Jan. 26 in Paris)
Guillaume-Gabriel Nivers – Livre d'orgue contenant cent pièces de tous les tons de l'église, the first organ collection that featured forms that became standard for the French Baroque organ school

Opera
Antonio Bertali – L'Alcindo
Andrea Mattioli – Ciro

Births 
February 21 (baptized) – Benedikt Anton Aufschnaiter, Austrian Baroque composer (died 1742)
March 17 – Élisabeth Jacquet de La Guerre, harpsichordist and composer (died 1729)
date unknown
Benedikt Anton Aufschnaiter, composer (died 1742)
Nicolaus Bruhns, organist and composer (died 1697)
Johann Nikolaus Hanff, organist and composer (died 1712)
José de Torres, composer, organist, music theorist and music publisher (died 1738)
probable – Carlo Giuseppe Testore, luthier (died 1716)

Deaths 
January 21 – Domenico Mazzochi, Italian composer (born 1592)
November 16 – João Lourenço Rebelo, Portuguese court composer (born 1610)
December 10 – Tarquinio Merula, organist, violinist and composer (born c.1594)

Notes